Jonathan Kindermans (born 27 December 1994) is a Belgian footballer who plays as an attacking midfielder, but is currently unemployed after most recently playing for Lierse Kempenzonen in the Belgian First Amateur Division. His former clubs include Telstar, RKC Waalwijk, OH Leuven and KV Mechelen.

Career statistics

External links

1994 births
Living people
Association football midfielders
Belgian footballers
R.S.C. Anderlecht players
SC Telstar players
RKC Waalwijk players
Oud-Heverlee Leuven players
K.V. Mechelen players
Royale Union Saint-Gilloise players
Eerste Divisie players
Belgian Pro League players
Challenger Pro League players
Lierse Kempenzonen players
RWDM47 players